Anne d'Ornano (née de Contades; born 7 December 1936) was the President of the General Council of the French department of Calvados. She has been President of the department since 1991. She was a member of the Union for French Democracy (UDF) until the UDF dissolved in 2007, and she did not join either of the UDF's claimed successors: the New Centre and the MoDem. Unlike most centrists, she supported Nicolas Sarkozy by the first round of the 2007 election, over UDF candidate François Bayrou. However, she is not a member of Sarkozy's Union for a Popular Movement (UMP).

She is the widow of Michel d'Ornano, whom she succeeded as President of the General Council at his death. She also succeeded him as Mayor of Deauville in 1977, a post she held until 2001 when she retired in favour of Philippe Augier.

D'Ornano has been awarded the Legion of Honour, and is also a commandeur of the Ordre national du Mérite.

References

1936 births
Living people
Politicians from Normandy
Grand Officiers of the Légion d'honneur
Commanders of the Ordre national du Mérite
Mayors of places in Normandy
People from Deauville
Union for French Democracy politicians
Women mayors of places in France
20th-century French women politicians
20th-century French politicians
21st-century French women politicians
21st-century French politicians